Robert H. Charles (1913–2000) was the United States Assistant Secretary of Defense for Installations and Logistics under Robert MacNamara.   He was credited with the creation of the failed Total Package Procurement process for acquisition.

Prior to joining the administration, he worked for the McDonnell Aircraft Corporation.

References

External links
 

United States Assistant Secretaries of Defense
McDonnell Douglas
American aerospace businesspeople
1913 births
2000 deaths